This is a list of airlines registered with the Palestinian National Authority.

Active airlines
Palestine has no active airlines.

Defunct airlines

See also
 List of airlines

Palestine
Airlines
Palestine